Petar Trifonov (: born 14 March 1984, in Pleven) is a Bulgarian footballer who last played as a defender for Svetkavitsa.

External links
 2007-08 Statistics, 2006-07 Statistics & 2005-06 Statistics at PFL.bg
   

1984 births
Living people
Bulgarian footballers
First Professional Football League (Bulgaria) players
PFC Belasitsa Petrich players
FC Dunav Ruse players
PFC Svetkavitsa players
Association football defenders